Richard Tobin was an Irish luthier and maker of violins, violas, cellos and pochettes. Tobin's work was largely uncredited, often branded under the names of his employers and other shops that enlisted him for his sought-after workmanship.

Early life
Tobin was born a few miles outside of Dublin, according to his own account. However, musicologist Brian Boydell suggested that he was born in Waterford, possibly because of the connection with some of his earlier instruments. Tobin's birthdate, presumably between 1760 and 1771, has also been debated amongst historians. Boydell notes his birthdate as being 1766, whereas research by musician Kenneth Rice proposes a likely birthdate of 1760. However, Tobin is recorded as being 70 years of age in the 1841 UK Census, which would put his birthdate at around 1771.

Tobin's love for the violin began as a young child, often hearing it at parties and wakes. As a boy he would often make violins out of boxes and scrap wood. At the age of fourteen, he made a very good instrument out of a willow block and sold it to a neighbouring player. It is said that the neighbour brought it to the attention of the renowned Dublin firm Perry and Wilkinson who were so impressed that they decided to apprentice him.

Career

Tobin apprenticed with the renowned Dublin luthier Thomas Perry between 1792–1798. One instrument bearing his label gives Waterford as his residence in 1800. He worked briefly for Bartholomew Murphy in Cork and then worked independently before moving to London shortly before on the advice of Vincenzo Panormo who had earlier worked for Perry. Tobins earliest London work is dated 1810 and appears to have been made under the aegis of Henry Lockey Hill. A violin dated 1817 is signed ‘R. Tobin for L. Hill’ internally. He was established in St Leonard Street, Finsbury Square, and from 1823 in his own premises at 9 West Street, Soho.

Tobin's workmanship is considered accurate and finely finished in classical Italian styles. He has the reputation of being the finest scroll carver in London in his time, and his hand can be recognized on many instruments with the shop label of John Betts, Thomas Dodd, Samuel Gilkes and Henry Lockey Hill. Despite his meticulous workmanship, he is said to have worked very fast, and apparently could finish a scroll inside of two hours. Some of his instruments were signed internally on the table and occasionally branded below back button, although authentic Tobin labels are extremely rare. The few instruments which bear his label are typically copies of Amati or Stradivari violins, and they are said to have a rich and mellow tone. The varnish on Tobin violins varies considerably as he often supplied shops with unvarnished instruments or used the varnish provided by the shop he was working in at the time.

Personal life
Some of what we know about Tobin's life comes from the 1841 UK Census. He is listed as living at 65 New Compton Street in St Giles, London with an Irish woman named Elizabeth Tobin (born ), presumably either his wife or sister. There are two children listed in the household, Elizabeth Tobin (born ) and Esther Tobin (born ), presumably his daughter and granddaughter (or niece and grandniece), both born in London. The parish of St Giles, where Tobin and his family were living, had a reputation for poverty and some of the worst living conditions in London. It is possible that Tobin ended up in that part of London because of his connection to Panormo, who had also settled there with his two youngest sons. Panormo's son, Louis, later set up his shop in the area, as did French luthier, Georges Chanot III, so it is possible that East Soho may have become known for violin making in 19th century London. It is better known that Tobin had a son named James, who apprenticed with him and was an active violin maker around 1830–1840. Like his father, James' work is very rarely identified and generally unlabeled, and he is thought to have worked exclusively for other violin makers and dealers.

Tobin was thought to be eccentric and intemperate, often trying the temper of his employers. He was known to go through extended periods of heavy drinking, until all his savings were spent after which he would remain sober for several months until he had saved up enough money again. He failed to sustain himself as a luthier in later life, ending up in Shoreditch poorhouse. He died in 1847 and was buried in a pauper's grave.

Extant instruments
It is unknown how many instruments Tobin produced in his lifetime. Some of them still survive today and occasionally come up for sale or auction, others are housed as part of collections or exhibits. However, many more are likely uncredited or branded under the names of his employers or their shops. One of his violins, made in London , is now part of The Harrison-Frank Family Foundation collection and is currently on loan to violinist Emma Pantel. One of Tobin's cellos, currently played by Thomas Mesa, was used to record soundtracks for the first movies ever created. One of his pochettes (also known as a kit or dance master's fiddle) is currently housed in the National Music Museum, Vermillion, South Dakota.

Some of Tobin's extant instruments:

Violins
 : Cork, made while working for Bartholomew Murphy of Cork
 : London, owned by The Harrison-Frank Family Foundation, used by Emma Pantel
 : London, made for Lockey Hill of London

Violas
 : London, unlabelled, sold by J & A Beare in 1952 (Cozio 10059)
 : London, stamped internally 'TOBIN, LONDON', sold in 2007, Boston

Cellos
 1826: London, used by Thomas Mesa
 : London, unlabelled

Pochettes
 : National Music Museum, Vermillion, South Dakota

References

Citations

Bibliography

External links
 Richard Tobin on Dublin Music Trade
 Richard Tobin on Brian Boydell Card Index
 Richard Tobin on Tarisio
 Richard Tobin on Brompton's
 Tobin pochette at National Music Museum

1771 births
1847 deaths
18th-century Irish businesspeople
19th-century Irish businesspeople
18th-century Irish people
19th-century Irish people
Bowed string instrument makers
Businesspeople from County Dublin
Irish luthiers
Irish musical instrument makers